Jermane Timothy Mayberry (born August 29, 1973) is a former American football offensive guard in the National Football League (NFL).  He was drafted in the first round of the 1996 NFL Draft by the Philadelphia Eagles.  During the beginning of his career, Mayberry played several positions along the offensive line before settling in at right guard for the majority of his tenure.  His solid play was recognized with a bid to the Pro Bowl after the 2002 season.  After the 2004 season, Mayberry signed with the New Orleans Saints, where he retired before the 2006 season.

Early years
Mayberry attended Floresville High School in Floresville, Texas and lettered in football and basketball there.

College career
At Texas A&M University Kingsville, Mayberry was a consensus Division II All-America selection and a two-time All-Lone Star Conference pick at left tackle.

Professional career
Mayberry decided to retire during the 2006 season while he was on the injured reserve list.

Personal life
In 1996, Mayberry contributed $100,000 to Eagles Youth Partnership to finance the Eagles Eye Mobile, a mobile unit giving free eye examinations to underprivileged youth in the Philadelphia region.  This can partially be contributed to a condition Mayberry developed as a child, as he has amblyopia in one eye.  He is also known to have established a frozen water ice franchise called Jayberry's Water Ice around 2003.

Mayberry became a Jehovah's Witness in 2002 after first being introduced to the faith by his wife in 1999.

External links
New Orleans Saints bio

References

1973 births
American football offensive guards
American football offensive tackles
Living people
National Conference Pro Bowl players
Navarro Bulldogs football players
New Orleans Saints players
Philadelphia Eagles players
Texas A&M–Kingsville Javelinas football players
Players of American football from Texas
People from Floresville, Texas